Stephen J. Fiala (born 1967) is a Republican Party lawmaker from the New York City Borough of Staten Island.

Appointed by former New York Governor George Pataki to become County Clerk of Richmond County, New York in 2001, he had previously served in the New York City Council.

References

1967 births
Living people
American people of Italian descent
County clerks in New York (state)
New York City Council members
New York (state) Republicans
Politicians from Staten Island